Devils Canyon is a steep canyon in the Jacumba Mountains in Imperial and San Diego County, California, United States.

History
From 1862 Devils Canyon was the route of a wagon road between San Diego and Yuma, Arizona. The canyon later became the route of the westbound lanes of Interstate 8 that pass up the canyon to Mountain Spring. The eastbound lanes use a different alignment through the In-Ko-Pah Gorge.

References

Valleys of Imperial County, California
Valleys of San Diego County, California
Interstate 8